Jack Vaughan may refer to:

Jack Vaughan (rugby union), see Connemara RFC
Jack Vaughan (American football), see Fog Bowl (American football)

See also
 John Vaughan (disambiguation)
Jack Vaughn, Peace Corps director
Jack Vaughn, Jr.